Stoylovsky is a rural locality (a khutor) in Mikhaylovka Urban Okrug, Volgograd Oblast, Russia. The population was 61 as of 2010. There are 5 streets.

Geography 
Stoylovsky is located 39 km southwest of Mikhaylovka. Blizhny is the nearest rural locality.

References 

Rural localities in Mikhaylovka urban okrug